Nhila Union (also spelt "Nhilla Union" and "Hnila Union") is a union, the smallest administrative body of Bangladesh, located in Teknaf Upazila, Cox's Bazar District, Bangladesh. The total population is 37,902.

References

Unions of Teknaf Upazila